The Office of the Gene Technology Regulator, supports the Gene Technology Regulator (the Regulator), and is a part of the Australian Government Department of Health and Ageing. The Office was established under the Commonwealth Gene Technology Act 2000 (the Act). This legislation sets forth a nationally consistent regulatory system for gene technology in Australia.

In Australia, all dealings with live and viable genetically modified organisms (GMOs), including import, are illegal unless authorised under the Act.

The OGTR has developed a range of documents to provide organisations and interested parties with guidance on monitoring and compliance activities under the Act.

Under the act, the regulator may issue technical and procedural guidelines in relation to GMOs (under section 27 of the Act), in relation to certification of facilities to specified containment levels (section 90) and in relation to accreditation of organisations (section 98). The Act, the Gene Technology Regulations 2001 (the Regulations) or instruments issued by the Regulator can require compliance with these guidelines in conducting dealings with GMOs or in obtaining and maintaining certification or accreditation.

To ensure the necessary approvals or authorisations are obtained prior to importation, the OGTR is working closely with the Australian Quarantine and Inspection Service (AQIS) especially in relation to GM seeds/grains.

The regulator
The regulator is an independent statutory office holder responsible for administering the Gene Technology Act 2000 (the Act) and corresponding state and territory laws. The regulator is appointed by the governor-general only with the agreement of the majority of all jurisdictions.  She is responsible for administering the national regulatory system for gene technology as set out in the Act. The OGTR staff are part of the Department of Health.

Office-holders
Dr Raj Bhula is the current Gene Technology Regulator, appointed for a period of five years commencing 18 July 2016.  Bhula has over 20 years experience in regulation of pesticides in Australia.  She was Executive Director of Scientific Assessment and Chemical Review at the Australian Pesticides and Veterinary Medicines Authority and Program Manager Pesticides for almost 10 years.  Bhula represented Australia at international expert committees including as the Codex Committee for Pesticide Residues and contributed to technical groups of the OECD Working Group on Pesticides. Much of this work has included the development of technical policy and risk assessment methodologies.

The regulator's roles and functions
In administering the gene technology regulatory system the Regulator has specific responsibility to protect the health and safety of people, and to protect the environment, by identifying risk posed by or as a result of gene technology, and by managing those risks through regulating certain dealings with GMOs.

Section 27 of the act sets out the functions of the regulator to:
 perform functions in relation to GMO licences as set out in the act (Part 5), which outlines the licensing system under which a person can apply to the Regulator for a licence authorising dealings with GMOs
 develop
 draft policy principles and policy guidelines, as requested by the LGFGT
 codes of practice
 issue technical and procedural guidelines in relation to GMOs
 provide information and advice to
 other regulatory agencies, about GMOs and GM products
 the public, about the regulation of GMOs
 the Legislative Governance Forum on Gene Technology about the
 operations of the Regulator and the Gene Technology Technical Advisory Committee
 effectiveness of the legislative framework for the regulation of GMOs, including in relation to possible amendments of relevant legislation
 undertake or commission research in relation to risk assessment and the biosafety of GMOs
 promote the harmonisation by regulatory agencies of risk assessments relating to GMOs and GM products
 monitor international practice in relation to the regulation of GMOs
 maintain links with international organisations that deal with the regulation of gene technology and with agencies that regulate GMOs in countries outside Australia
 conduct other functions conferred by the Act, the Regulations or any other law, such as
 monitoring and enforcing the legislation
 reporting quarterly to the minister and Federal Parliament.

Governance arrangements
The Act and Regulations and corresponding state and territory laws provide a nationally consistent system to regulate development and use of gene technology in Australia. The legislation establishes the Regulator as an independent statutory office holder to administer the national scheme. Under the intergovernmental Gene Technology Agreement, the states and territories have committed to maintaining corresponding legislation with the Commonwealth. The Regulator is charged with performing functions and exercising powers under the Act and corresponding legislation.

While the Regulator must consider risks to human health and safety and the environment relating to dealings with GMOs, other agencies have responsibility for regulating GMOs or genetically modified (GM) products as part of a broader or different mandate. During development of the gene technology legislation, it was determined that the Regulator's activities should form part of an integrated legislative framework that also includes a number of other regulatory authorities with complementary responsibilities and expertise. This arrangement both enhances coordinated decision-making and avoids duplication. The Gene Technology Act was accompanied by consequential amendments of the other relevant Acts relating to requirements for reciprocal request and provision of advice and exchange of information between the Regulator and other relevant regulatory agencies. These requirements include the following:
 the Regulator must consult Commonwealth regulatory agencies prescribed in the Regulations on all licence applications for dealings involving the intentional release of GMOs to the environment
 there are requirements for agencies regulating GM products to consult and/or notify the Regulator regarding applications for registration of products that are GM or contain GMOs.
These provisions support an adequate and timely flow of information between the agencies to inform assessments and decisions. (Accordingly, where other agencies approve GM products, they seek advice from the Regulator and provide notification of their decisions to the Regulator for inclusion on the GMO Record.)

References

External links
 Office of the Gene Technology Regulator Website

Commonwealth Government agencies of Australia
Agriculture in Australia
Medical and health organisations based in Australia
2000 establishments in Australia
Regulatory authorities of Australia
Regulation of genetically modified organisms